The Black Nazarene is a life-sized image of a dark, genuflecting image of Jesus Christ carrying the True Cross enshrined in Minor Basilica of the Black Nazarene in Quiapo, Manila, Philippines.

The image was reputedly carved by an unknown Mexican artist in the 16th century and then brought to the Philippines in 1606. It depicts Jesus en route to his crucifixion. 

Pope Innocent X granted recognition to the lay Confraternity of the namesake image in 1650 for religious devotion. It was housed in various churches near Manila, then permanently stationed in Quiapo Church in 1787 where it remains today. 

Pope John Paul II issued a Pontifical decree Qui Loco Petri which raised the shrine to the status of Minor Basilica on 11 December 1988. The decree was signed and notarized by the Vatican Secretary of State, Cardinal Agostino Casaroli. 

Pious believers claim that physically touching the image can bring miracles and cure diseases. The original image or its replica is given a religious procession three times a year:

 January 9 —  the official Feast of the Black Nazarene commemorating the translation of the image from Intramuros. 
 Good Friday —  it’s liturgical feast, commemorating the culmination of the Passion of Jesus. 
 December 31 — the eve of New Year commencing its novena.

Name and Parts
The image derives its official name from "Nazarene", a title of Christ identifying him as a native of Nazareth, along with its darkened complexion — something uncommon amongst local depictions of adult Jesus which often have fair skin.

Main carriage 
The image's wooden base is referred to as the peana while its carriage or carroza used in processions is called the ándas (from the Spanish andar, "to move forward"). The term ándas commonly refers to the shoulder-borne palanquins of religious images, and was retained for the icon's carriage that replaced the silver palanquins used until the late 20th century.

Composition and main replica 
There is no singular complete image of the Black Nazarene as there are several images and replicas in different combinations.

 The Vicário is the replica processional image, used for the annual Traslación, as well as the New Year's Eve and Good Friday processions. 
 The head of the original Black Nazarene is on the image enshrined in the high altar, which has a body made of  Molave wood (Genus: Vitex parviflora or Vitex cofassus). 
 The original right hand of the image is kept in the office of the parish priest that is used for blessing people, especially the sick and dying. 
 The Vicário retains the original body torso, with a replica head of (Litsea leytensis) wood (Filipino: Batikulíng)

Other replicas 
Aside from the original image on the high altar and the Vicário main replica, the basilica also owns three external replicas of the image, called Callejeros. 

These sanctioned replicated effigies are sent to visit various shrines in across the different Catholic dioceses in the country according to popular demand.

History

Original image

The image was made by an anonymous Mexican sculptor and arrived in Manila via galleon from Acapulco, Mexico on May 31, 1606. Folk belief attributes the colour of the image to soot from votive candles burnt before it, although the most popular legend is that it was charred by a fire on the galleon that brought it from Mexico.

Researcher of Catholic theology, Monsignor Sabino Vengco meanwhile noted that the image was not charred, but in fact dark through to its core as it was carved from mesquite wood. Vengco based this claim on personal research in Mexico, where he said mesquite wood was a popular medium in the period the image was carved. He also likened it to Our Lady of Antipolo, another popular image of similar provenance and appearance.

The image was first enshrined in the Church of San Juan Bautista of the Augustinian Recollects in Bagumbayan, Luneta. In 1608, the image was transferred to the Church of San Nicolás de Tolentino (popularly known as the "Recoletos Church") inside Intramuros. It was enshrined in the retablo mayor or high altar of the church, leaving only for a procession on Palm Sunday. Both the church and the image were destroyed in the Allied bombardment of Manila during its liberation in 1945.

Replica and Vandalism (1998)
On 9 January 1787, the Augustinian Recollect priests donated a copy of the image to the Church of the Camisa (later renamed Quiapo Church). This donation is celebrated by the faithful every January 9 by means of a procession (the Traslación) from Quiapo Church to Rizal Park (where the aforementioned Church of San Juan Bautista, the image's first home once stood in Bagumbayan) and back to Quiapo.

In the 1990s, the Archdiocese of Manila feared that the image might be damaged during the Traslación, fire, or natural disaster. The most notable case was when during the 1998 Traslación, a fanatical member of the Iglesia ni Cristo religion shot the image's left cheek using a gun. It caused a hysterical commotion that led to the shooter's death. To date, the gunshot wound on the cheek has remained unrestored and not remedied by pious popular demand.  

The archdiocese later commissioned Mr. Gener Maglaqui, Filipino santero (English: a sculptor of religious images), to sculpt a replica of the head and body. The Augustinian Recollects head of 1787 now sits atop the 1990s body, which remains enshrined behind the church's main altar. The 1990s head was placed atop the Augustinian Recollects body. It is this composite combination which is used during major processions.

The image celebrated its 400th Quadricentennial anniversary on 9 January 2006.

Description

The Black Nazarene's head wears a braided wig made of dark, dyed abacá, along with a golden Crown of Thorns. Attached to the Crown are the traditional "Tres Potencias" ("three powers") halo, variously understood as symbolising the three powers of the Holy Trinity; the faculties of will, memory, and understanding in Christ's soul; or his exousia (authority), dunamis (power), and kratos (strength). These three rayos ("rays"), likely an angular variant of the cruciform halo, are used exclusively for and proper to images of Jesus Christ in traditional Filipino and Hispanic iconography to signify his divinity. The original image has lost several fingers over the centuries.

Jesus is shown barefoot and in a genuflecting posture, symbolising the agony and the weight of the Cross, along with the overall pain Christ endured during his Passion. The Cross itself is of black wood tipped with flat, pyramidal brass caps.

Vestments 
The image is always dressed in a heavy velvet tunic of maroon, embroidered with floral and plant designs using gold thread, and trimmed with a matching set of white lace collar and cuffs. Around the waist is a gold-plated metal belt embossed with the word "NAZARENO", while a golden chain ending in spheres is looped around the neck and held in the left hand, representing the Flagellation of Christ.

The image's vestments are changed in the rite of Pabihis (English: for “Vesting the image"), which is presided over by a Catholic priest vested in an alb, red cope and stole. Devotees watching the ceremony either sit inside the basilica, or follow along outside in Plaza Miranda. The rite comprises with several hymns, the reading of scriptural lessons, the recitation of prayers, and then the blessing of the new vestments. As a sign of modesty and reverence, a curtain is raised to shield the statue from public view as the male attendants called Hijos change its vestments, and then it is dropped once the actual changing is complete. The old vestments are folded and presented to the faithful, who queue to kiss and touch these in the belief these bear the image's miraculous properties. The rite of vesting is officiated five times a year in preparation for major religious occasions, since 2022 a few of the vesting day rites are also livestreamed online.

Pontifical approbations 
 Pope Innocent X approved veneration of the image in 1650 as a sacramental, and authorised the establishment of the Confraternity of the Most Holy Jesus Nazarene (Spanish: Cofradía de Nuestro Santo Jesús Nazareno). For most of the Spanish Era, indigenous Filipinos were barred from Holy Orders, while confraternities were groups of laymen and thus an open option for religious life.

 Pope Pius VII granted the image his Apostolic Blessing in 1880, which granted a plenary indulgence to those who piously pray before the Christological image. 
 Pope John Paul II issued a Pontifical decree “Qui Loco Petri” which raised the shrine to the status of Minor Basilica on 11 December 1988. The decree was signed by the Vatican Secretary of State, Cardinal Agostino Casaroli.

Pious cult and veneration

Veneration of the Black Nazarene is rooted among Filipinos who strongly identify with the passion and suffering of Christ the image depicts. Many devotees of the Black Nazarene relate their poverty and daily struggles to the Passion of Christ.

Some believers practice walking in barefoot as a form of piety while others make an effort to ride on the carriage in the belief of obtaining graces from the devotional image. Prior to the Second Vatican Council, procession of the image was relatively solemn and peaceful. The rowdy and massive nature of the procession began in the 1960s as the population grew and greater hype surrounded the image. 

While the actual patron saint of the basilica is John the Baptist (making its feast day 24 June, concurrent with the secular Manila Day), the Black Nazarene and its Traslación are more popular.

At the end of each Mass said in the basilica, devotees pay homage to the image by clapping their hands. In addition to the novena, Traslación, Pahalík, and the Pabihis, the Pasindí ("lighting") or lighting of votive candles is another popular devotion, as is the decades-old, reverential custom of creeping on one's knees down the main aisle towards the altar and image.
 
The Friday of each week in the year (except Good Friday, the image's liturgical commemoration) is colloquially known in Metro Manila as "Quiapo Day", since the novena for the image is held on this day nationwide. As with Wednesday (which is comparably called "Baclaran Day"), this day is associated with heavy traffic around the basilica due to the influx of devotees and pilgrims.

The attached Nazarene Catholic School (formerly the Quiapo Parochial School) reflects the devotion of school authorities; its official newsletter is likewise named "The Nazarene", with pupils called "Nazareñans."

The largest annual procession for the Black Nazarene is the January 9 Traslación procession on the Feast of the Black Nazarene, attracting millions of Catholic devotees, who try to touch or get their towel wiped by the image carriers on the image to attain its blessings and power. Along with Santo Niño (Child Jesus), it is the most popular object of devotion in the Philippines. In 2011, over six million Catholic devotees flocked to the Feast of the Black Nazarene.

Music 
The hymn Nuestro Padre Jesús Nazareno was composed by National Artist of the Philippines, Lucio San Pedro to honour the image. It is used by the basilica as the official anthem to the image and associated rites.

The image is also prominently featured on the front cover  of  Pabasa books, a Lenten manual hymn commemorating the life and Passion of Jesus Christ.

Claims of indigenous idolatry
 According to Jaime Laya, the devotional worship of the image  is a modernized form of cultural indigenous  idolatry, declaring that it may be a continuation of possibly pre—Christianized local ritual practices where indigenous Filipinos of the old religions are widely known to physically revere sacred objects by tangible pious touching (Filipino: “Hipo”). Elizabeth Pisares also states that this is a revised idolatry of pre—colonial times, and suggests its link with social disparities among Filipinos. 

 In contrast, according to the rector of the basilica, Father José Clemente Ignacio, the procession and overall devotion is not idolatry but a cultural reflection of the "Filipino trait to want to wipe, touch, kiss, or embrace sacred objects if possible", and that it is belief in "the presence of the Divine in sacred objects and places". 

 According to Mariano Barbato, the debate over the icon is centred on personal interpretations of what constitutes idolatry, when any religious icon becomes a deity and what makes the annual processions idolatrous, all in perspective and mindset.

See also
Feast of the Black Nazarene
Black Madonna
List of statues of Jesus

References

External links

Quiapo Church Website Minor Basilica of the Black Nazarene – Parish of Saint John the Baptist • Quiapo • Manila
GMA NEWS.TV,   Emergency: Pista ng Nazareno - 01/12/2008
GMA NEWS.TV, Gma News Research, The Black Nazarene
Pinoys celebrate 405th anniversary of the Black Nazarene 2012
Inquirer News | Philippine Catholic pilgrims defy terror alert
Manila Bulletin | Devotees defy threat

Arts in Mexico
Christian folklore
Culture in Manila
Statues of Jesus
Depictions of kneeling